Film Forum is a nonprofit movie theater at 209 West Houston Street in Greenwich Village, Manhattan.  It began in 1970 as an alternative screening space for independent films, with 50 folding chairs, one projector and a $19,000 annual budget. Karen Cooper became director in 1972. Its current Greenwich Village cinema (on Houston Street, west of Sixth Avenue) was built in 1990. Film Forum is a 4-screen cinema open 365 days a year, with 280,000 annual admissions, nearly 500 seats, 60 employees, 4500 members and an operating budget of $5 million. Film Forum is the only autonomous nonprofit cinema in New York City and one of the few in the United States of America. In 1994, Film Forum was honored with a Village Award by the Greenwich Village Society for Historic Preservation, even though it is technically in Soho. In 2018, Film Forum had a major renovation, adding new seats (and in turn, more leg room) and a fourth theater.

Programming
Film Forum presents two distinct film programs. Premieres of American independents and foreign art films, programmed by Karen Cooper and Mike Maggiore, and repertory programming, which includes foreign and American classics, genre works, festivals, and directors' retrospectives, programmed by Bruce Goldstein. In January 2013 Goldstein started a series called Film Forum Jr. which shows a classic films appropriate for children and their parents.

Reputation
Filmmakers such as Agnès Varda, D. A. Pennebaker, Christopher Nolan, Kelly Reichardt, Ramin Bahrani and many others have praised the theater and its programming. Director and actor André Gregory said in 2022, “If New York lost the Statue of Liberty, it would not be a real loss, but if Film Forum disappeared, it would be absolutely heartbreaking.”

See also

 List of art cinemas in New York City
 Bruce Goldstein

References

External links

1970 establishments in New York City
Cinemas and movie theaters in Manhattan
Repertory cinemas
Greenwich Village